Sulphur Springs Independent School District is a public school district based in Sulphur Springs, Texas (USA).

In 2009, the school district was rated "academically acceptable" by the Texas Education Agency.

Schools
Sulphur Springs High School (Grades 9-12)
Sulphur Springs Middle (Grades 6-8)
Sulphur Springs Elementary (Grades 4-5)
Barbara Bush Primary (Grades K-3)
Bowie Primary (Grades K-3)
Lamar Primary (Grades K-3)
Travis Primary (Grades K-3)
Douglass Early Childhood Learning Center (Grades Headstart, PK)
Austin Alternative Education

References

External links
Sulphur Springs ISD

School districts in Hopkins County, Texas